The Kishishe massacre (French: Massacre de Kishishe) occurred on from November 29 to December 1, 2022, in the North Kivu village of Kishishe in the Rutchuru Territory in the eastern Democratic Republic of the Congo. The March 23 Movement, a predominantly Tutsi armed group, summarily killed at least 131 civilians in Kishishe following clashes with local militias, according to a preliminary United Nations investigation. At the same time, the Kinshasa authorities had mentioned approximately 300 dead in the massacre. More than hundreds of thousands of people were displaced to other locations, such as, Kanyabayonga, Kibirizi, Kashala, Kirima, Nyanzale, Kashalira, Bambu and Kitchanga, or taken refuge in neighboring countries.

The massacre provoked a salvo of indignation around the world and caused widespread outrage from targeted communities, as well as Congolese politicians, including Juvénal Munubo Mubi, Moise Katumbi, Martin Fayulu, Felix Tshisekedi, Patrick Muyaya Katembwe, Julien Paluku Kahongya and Jean-Pierre Bemba.

Background 
For over a year, M23 militias have been escalating attacks in the North Kivu region of the Democratic Republic of Congo. A mainly Tutsi rebellion defeated in 2013, the M23 (“March 23 Movement”) took up arms again at the end of 2021.

In the M23's view, the Congolese government has not been able to protect their diverse interests––their security, investments, political power and had failed to honour a pledge to integrate its fighters into the army. To safeguard these assets, the M23 has committed summary executions and forced recruitment of civilians in eastern Democratic Republic of Congo. The Tutsi community occupies a precarious position in North Kivu, between privilege and discrimination. Its leaders are some of the wealthiest landowners and entrepreneurs in the region. These privileges have positioned the Tutsi community precariously in Congolese society, alternately benefitting from access to state power and suffering virulent discrimination, being persecuted and participating in brutal rebellions.

For the locals, they see M23 as a Rwandan-backed rebellion that is massively looting minerals among other natural resources in North Kivu.

Attack 
The attack took place in Kishishe village, in the Bambo groupement, in the chiefdom of Bwito, about 34 kilometers from Rwindi. According to provincial officials, NGOs, the United Nations, and human rights activists, the M23 made incursions to several villages with soldiers who allegedly came from Mabenga and Tongo. The rebels were wearing military uniforms, described by some as new and different from the Armed Forces of the Democratic Republic of the Congo (FARDC) uniforms, as well as helmets and bulletproof vests, and spoke Kinyarwanda. The rebels carried out their first foray into the Tongo groupement, where over 64 people were killed in the villages of Muhindo, Rusekera and Bugina. After executing civilians in the villages of the Tongo groupement, the insurgents made their second foray into the Bambo groupement, where they cursorily killed civilians in the Kishishe, Kirumba, and Kapopi villages and looted medical centers in the areas it controlled, looking for enemy. The provincial deputies believe the death toll is more than 131 people killed, including almost all of the Kishishe village, where around sixty civilians were killed in the Kishishe Adventist Church, including 3 children. They also systematically looted standing crops and transported them to their camps, notably in Tshanzu. The rebels forced civilians, including women and children, to work in the fields or do chores and calling them “FDLR sympathizers”. The massacre left around 300 people dead, including 17 children, according to provincial deputies. According to investigators from the United Nations Joint Human Rights Office (UNJHRO) and the United Nation mission in the DRC, 131 civilians were killed by the M23 in Kishishe and Bambo.

Reaction 
The reaction was widespread after the massacre and provoked outrage and revulsion among the Congolese populace as well as prominent opposition politicians. After the representatives and dignitaries of the local administration of Bwito condemned these crimes, the President of the Republic, Felix Tshisekedi, firmly condemned the killings on Friday, December 2, 2022. On the same Friday, Nobel Peace Prize winner Denis Mukwenge was also indignant of the massacre. The MONUSCO, the United Nations peacekeeping mission, demands an investigation and the ambassador of the European Union (EU) in the Democratic Republic of Congo calls for an immediate cessation of hostilities and respect for International humanitarian law (IHL). Some world powers, including British Development Minister Andrew Mitchell, expressed their concern and outrage at the massacre. The NGODH, a consortium of human rights organizations in North Kivu, demanded the United Nations and the Congolese government seize the International Criminal Court (ICC).

Government reaction 
According to Patrick Muyaya, government spokesman, the government is conducting a national investigation into the crimes. In addition, it will ensure that an investigation is launched at the international level.

Incidentally, the Congolese government decreed three days of national mourning, which ended on Monday, December 5, 2022, according to the report of the Council of Ministers, read by its spokesperson.

Demands for sanctions 
On his twitter account, Denis Mukwege, denounced the mass massacre, missing people and the forced recruitment of children.

He stated: “These crimes must lead to prompt sanctions against the occupying forces M23\RDF and prosecution by national and international justice”. By the same token, Martin Fayulu, president of the political party Engagement for Citizenship and Development (ECiDé), pleads for sanctions against Rwanda at the United Nations level.

MONUSCO requests an investigation 
For its part, MONUSCO also states it is horrified by reports of human rights abuses allegedly attributed to M23 in Kishishe village. On their Twitter account, the United Nations mission denounced the crimes on Thursday, December 1.

The MONUSCO declared:“Appalling acts and calls on the competent authorities to investigate without delay and bring the perpetrators to justice”.

See also 

 Beni massacre
 Kipupu Massacre
 Mutarule
 Lemera
 Mulenge
 2020 Democratic Republic of the Congo attacks

References 

Massacres in 2022